Senator Cowan may refer to:

Edgar Cowan (1815–1885), U.S. Senator from Pennsylvania from 1861 to 1867
Jim Cowan (born 1942), Canadian Senator for Nova Scotia from 2005 to 2017
Mo Cowan (born 1969), U.S. Senator from Massachusetts in 2013
Thomas F. Cowan (1927–2010), New Jersey State Senate

See also
Anna Cowin (fl. 1960s–2000s), Florida State Senate